Order of the Eagle may refer to:

 Eagle alone
 Order of the Aztec Eagle (Mexico)
 Order of the Black Eagle (Prussia)
 Order of the Black Eagle, Albania
 Order of the Eagle of Este (Duchy of Modena)
 Most Excellent Order of the Eagle (Namibia)
 Order of the German Eagle (Third Reich)
 Order of the Golden Eagle (Kazakhstan)
 Order of the Mexican Eagle
 Order of the Red Eagle (Prussia)
 Order of the Roman Eagle (Fascist Italy)
 Order of the White Eagle (disambiguation)
 Order of the White Eagle (Poland)
 Order of the White Eagle (Serbia)

 Eagle and other elements
 Order of the Cross of the Eagle (Estonia)
 Order of the Star and Eagles of Ghana
 Order of the Eagle of Georgia and the Seamless Tunic of Jesus Christ